Ethel Gordon Fenwick (née Manson; 26 January 1857 – 13 March 1947) was a British nurse who played a major role in the History of Nursing in the United Kingdom. She campaigned to procure a nationally recognised certificate for nursing, to safeguard the title "Nurse", and lobbied Parliament to pass a law to control nursing and limit it to "registered" nurses only.

Biography
She was born Ethel Gordon Manson in Spynie, near the Moray town of Elgin in Scotland, the daughter of a wealthy farmer and doctor who died later the same year. Ethel's mother then married George Storer, a Member of Parliament. She was educated privately at Middlethorpe Hall, Middlethorpe, Yorkshire. At the age of 21 she commenced nurse training at the Children's Hospital in Nottingham as a paying probationer nurse, and then at Manchester Royal Infirmary. Her expertise was soon noted and it was not long before she left for London, where she worked in hospitals in Whitechapel, and Richmond.

In 1881, at the age of 24, Ethel was appointed Matron of St Bartholomew's Hospital, a post she held until 1887 when she resigned her post to marry Dr Bedford Fenwick, becoming known professionally as Mrs Bedford Fenwick.

She was the founder of the Royal British Nurses' Association in 1887.
She was instrumental in founding Florence Nightingale International Foundation, the premier foundation of the International Council of Nurses, and was its president for the first five years. She extended significantly the training period for nurses, and campaigned for the state registration of nurses in the United Kingdom. This was achieved through the Nurses Registration Act 1919, and Ethel Gordon Fenwick appears as "Nurse No. 1" when the register opened in 1923. (The Cape Colony had been the first to introduce nurse registration, in 1891).

Ethel Fenwick acquired the Nursing Record in 1893 and became its editor in 1903. It was renamed The British Journal of Nursing and through its pages for the next 54 years her thinking and her beliefs are clearly revealed.  She disagreed with Florence Nightingale and with Henry Burdett about registration of nurses.  She believed that there was a need for training to a recognised standard and this meant confining entry to the profession to the daughters of the higher social classes. She opposed paying nurses in training, because it attracted the wrong sort of girl.  She was very keen to see control over domiciliary nursing.

In 1927 she established the British College of Nurses with an endowment of £100,000 from a grateful patient of Dr Fenwick.  She was president, and he was treasurer, for life.

In 1999 an English Heritage "blue plaque" was attached to her former home at 20 Upper Wimpole Street, London.

References

Sources
 McGann, Susan. "Fenwick, Ethel Gordon (1857–1947)", Oxford Dictionary of National Biography, Oxford University Press, 2004; online edn, Jan 2010 accessed 7 Oct 2010
"ETHEL GORDON FENWICK, S.R.N.. A SHORT OUTLINE OF HER LIFE AND WORK". The British Journal of Nursing Volume 95, Page 37 (April 1947) [pdf]

External links

Florence Nightingale International Foundation
The Royal British Nurses' Association: Registration of Nurses
The University of Sheffield: Nursing and Midwifery History UK 

RCN: Historical biographies - "Mrs Bedford Fenwick: A Restless Genius".

1856 births
1947 deaths
People from Elgin, Moray
British nurses
British nursing administrators